John T. Preston is a venture capitalist and entrepreneur who previously ran Technology Licensing for the Massachusetts Institute of Technology, best known for contributions to the energy, environment, and technology industries. During his 30 years at MIT, Preston held multiple positions mostly focused on the interface between the university and industry and entrepreneurship. Preston was awarded the rank of “Knight of the Order of National Merit of France” (Ordre national du Mérite) by Francois Mitterrand and the “Hammer Award for Reinventing Government” (National Partnership for Reinventing Government by Al Gore. He also chaired George H. W. Bush’s conference announcing the President’s technology initiative and has testified as a technology expert seven times before Congress. Preston has previously served as a Board Advisor to Mars, Incorporated. Preston is currently on the Board of Clean Harbors, ExThera Medical, Green Cement and Vantem Global. Preston has also filed several patents.

Preston earned a BS in physics from the University of Wisconsin (1972) and a master of management degree from Northwestern University (1976).

See also
Ordre national du Mérite

References

Massachusetts Institute of Technology faculty
Living people
Year of birth missing (living people)
University of Wisconsin–Madison alumni
Northwestern University alumni